Carl Kirwan (born 21 March 1991) is an English rugby union player who plays for Nottingham in the RFU Championship.

Kirwan came through the Newcastle Falcons academy, previously spent two years at Rotherham Titans following a spell with hometown club Middlesbrough.

Kirwan made a significant impact during his campaigns at London Welsh previously captained the side, scoring eight tries in 24 Championship appearances and helped the club beat Bristol to win promotion to the Aviva Premiership, and was subsequently named Supporters Club Player of the Year.

On 16 June 2015, Kirwan left London Welsh to sign for Worcester Warriors in the Aviva Premiership from the 2015-16 season.

After a season at National League 1 side Chinnor he was signed by Nottingham in the RFU Championship were he will combine his rugby career with a career in construction.

References

External links
Worcester Warriors Profile

1991 births
Living people
English rugby union players
Rotherham Titans players
Rugby union players from Durham, England
Worcester Warriors players
London Welsh RFC players
Rugby union flankers